The Îlot Pasteur is a building on the western edge of Monaco under construction since 2016. It will be home to a new middle school, a post office, a recycling center, a data center, an underground carpark.

History
Its construction was announced in 2013, and it began in January 2016. The building is designed by architects Christian Curau and François Lallemand.

References

Buildings and structures in Monaco
2016 establishments in Monaco